Penske Motor Group is an El Monte, California, U.S.–based, subsidiary of Penske Corporation, managed by Gregory Penske.  The group operates four automobile dealerships in California: Longo Toyota and Longo Lexus in the Greater Los Angeles Area and Lexus of Stevens Creek in the San Francisco Bay Area. It also operates one dealership in Texas: Longo Toyota of Prosper in the Dallas–Fort Worth metroplex area.

In addition to Toyota sales and service facilities, the El Monte dealership campus also includes a Starbucks, Subway restaurant, Verizon Wireless store, Enterprise Rent-A-Car agency, and an Automobile Club of Southern California office.

History
Penske Motor Group origins date back to 1985 when Roger Penske acquired Longo Toyota in El Monte.  Longo Toyota had been founded in 1967 by Dominic Longo.  Roger Penske's son, Greg, joined the dealership in 1988 as new car sales manager and is now Chairman and CEO of the Penske Motor Group division of Penske Corporation. 

Penske Motor Group's latest addition is Longo Toyota of Prosper, Texas which opened in 2017.

See also
Penske Corporation
Penske Automotive Group.

References
Press release naming Gregory Penske to board of directors to ALLTEL, Retrieved January 10, 2007
Penske Automotive Group, Inc. by Hoovers, Retrieved January 10, 2007
Community Partnership by Lexus of Stevens Creek, Retrieved August 10, 2011
Community Calendar by Lexus of Stevens Creek, Retrieved August 10, 2011

External links
Official Website

Auto dealerships of the United States
Companies based in Los Angeles County, California
MotorGroup
El Monte, California